The Toyota ND is an inline-four diesel engine used for Toyota models in various markets including Japanese, Indian and European ones.

1ND-TV
The 1ND-TV (1.4 D-4D) is a compact inline-four cylinder turbocharged diesel engine used in various markets including Japanese, Indian and European markets. It was introduced into European market in 2002 with the Yaris XP10 and XP20 Yaris Verso. it was Toyota's first diesel engine to be equipped with an aluminium cylinder block. It was offered in Indian market in Toyota Corolla ( model) & Etios (68PS model) sedans. Principal aims of its development were low emissions and fuel consumption, reduction of mass (dry weight is ) and reduction of noise.

Technical specifications of the latest engine version:
 Displacement: 
 Bore x stroke: 
 Max. power:
 (FGT) at 3800 rpm
 (FGT) at 4000 rpm
 (VGT) at 3800 rpm
 (VGT) at 3800 rpm
 Max. torque:
 (FGT) at 1800 - 2400 rpm
 (FGT) at 2000 - 2800 rpm
 (VGT) at 1800 - 2800 rpm
 (VGT) at 1800 - 2800 rpm
 (VGT) at 1400 - 2800 rpm ( Euro 6 emissions with smaller turbo and increased rail pressure  )
 Fuel Supply system: direct injection
 Intake system: fixed/variable-geometry turbocharger with intercooler
 Valve mechanism: SOHC, 2 valves per cylinder
 Compression Ratio: 
 18.5:1
 17.9:1
 16.0:1
 Camshaft drive: timing chain
 Exhaust gas treatment: EGR, equipped with cooler and catalytic converter;
 Emission standard: Euro III (2001–2005); Euro IV, Euro V; Euro VI ( 2015 ); BS IV
 Fuel economy as per ARAI: , 
  emission combined: /km * * Toyota Corolla 1.4 D-4D, NEDC  ** /km  Toyota Yaris 
 Production: Japan

Applications
 Toyota Auris
 Toyota Corolla
 Toyota Etios
Toyota Etios Liva
Toyota Etios Cross
 Toyota iQ
 Toyota Ractis
 Toyota Urban Cruiser
 Toyota Verso-S
 Toyota Yaris
 Mini One D
 Toyota Probox

Notes

References

ND
Diesel engines by model
Straight-four engines